Sysertsky District is an administrative district (raion), one of the thirty in Sverdlovsk Oblast, Russia. Its administrative center is the town of Sysert.

Administrative and municipal status
Within the framework of administrative divisions, Sysertsky District is one of the thirty in the oblast. The town of Sysert serves as its administrative center.

As a municipal division, the territory of the district is split between two municipal formations—Sysertsky Urban Okrug, to which the town of Sysert and thirty-seven of the administrative district's rural localities belong, and Aramilsky Urban Okrug, which covers the rest of the administrative district's territory, including the town of Aramil and two remaining rural localities.

References

Notes

Sources

Districts of Sverdlovsk Oblast
